The 2016–17 winter transfer window for English football transfers opened on 1 January and closes on 1 February. Additionally, players without a club may join at any time, non-League clubs may sign players on loan at any time, and clubs may sign a goalkeeper on an emergency loan if they have no registered goalkeeper available. This list includes transfers featuring at least one Premier League or Football League Championship club which were completed after the end of the summer 2016 transfer window and before the end of the 2016–17 winter window. The transfer window is open for all clubs, whereas when the transfer window closes, no transfers can take place. 1 February 2017 is the transfer deadline day.

Transfers

All clubs without a flag are English. Note that while Cardiff City, Swansea City, Newport County and Wrexham are affiliated with the Football Association of Wales and thus take the Welsh flag, they play in the English football league system, and so their transfers are included here. Guernsey, who also play in the English league system, are affiliated with the Guernsey Football Association but, as this is treated as a County Football Association, the club does not require a flag.

 Player officially joined his club on 1 January 2017.
 Player officially joined his club on 2 January 2017.
 Player officially joined his club on 3 January 2017.
 Deal was cancelled due to EFL rules.
 Player will officially joined his club new club at the end of the season.

References

England
Winter 2016-17